Mida is an Israeli current affairs and opinion online magazine self-identifying with classical and conservative liberalism, and the national-liberal Right, targeting a secular and right-wing readership in both the political and economic sense of the term, comparable to the US  
Republican Party of 2013, with a "realist position" on security issues.

History and profile
Mida was launched by Ran Baratz and El Haprat, a nonprofit organization financed by the New York-based Tikvah Fund, chaired by Roger Hertog.

Some of its articles had been published on the HaAyin HaShevi'it Internet site.

In 2017, the Nrg.co.il website posted the findings of Akiva Bigman, at that point reporting both under the logo of  Israel Hayom and Mida, in the Umm al-Hiran incident, which lead to the death of a Bedouin teacher and a policeman.

Contributors 
Yehuda Harel
Amnon Lord
Erel Segal
Daniel Seaman

See also
List of online magazines
Media of Israel

References

External links
 Archive Articles at the official website 
 Articles at the official website 
 Articles at the official website 

2012 establishments in Israel
Conservatism in Israel
Conservative magazines
English-language websites
Hebrew-language websites
Magazines published in Israel
Israeli news websites
Israeli political websites
Magazines established in 2012
Mass media in Jerusalem
Multilingual news services
Multilingual websites
Online magazines